Beasts of the Southern Wild and Other Stories is a 1973 collection of short stories by Doris Betts. The collection was nominated for a 1974 National Book Award. 

The story "The Ugliest Pilgrim" was adapted into the short film “Violet,” which won Best Live Action Short at the 54th Academy Awards.  It was later adapted into the musical Violet.

The title story "Beasts of the Southern Wild" was originally published in The Carolina Quarterly in 1973. The title derives from the William Blake poem "The Little Black Boy." It is about an unhappily married woman named Carol who fantasizes she has been chosen as a concubine by Sam Porter, the provost of New African University.

Stories
The Ugliest Pilgrim
Hitchiker
The Mother-in-Law
Beasts of the Southern Wild
Burning the Bed
Still Life with Fruit
The Glory of his Nostrils
The Spider Gardens of Madagascar
Benson Watts is Dead and in Virginia

References

External links
Beasts of the Southern Wild and Other Stories via Simon & Schuster

1973 short story collections
American short story collections
Harper & Row books